Mona Bone Jakon is the third studio album by singer-songwriter Cat Stevens, released in April 1970 on the Island Records label in the United Kingdom and on A&M in the United States and Canada.

Overview
After a meteoric start to his career, surprising even his original producer at Deram Records with the hit singles "I Love My Dog", "Matthew and Son", and "I'm Gonna Get Me a Gun", Stevens' debut album, Matthew and Son, began charting. However, after the pressure for a repeat album of the same calibre, Stevens, considered a young teen sensation, was overwhelmed by a new lifestyle as well as the demands of writing, recording, performing, publicity appearances, and touring. His second album was a commercial failure and in the autumn of 1968, he was hospitalized, with a diagnosis of tuberculosis and a collapsed lung. For over a year, while recovering, Stevens virtually disappeared from the British pop scene. Mona Bone Jakon is notable not only for his return but for the emergence of a very different artist. The album sold slowly (at first) but over time has been certified Gold for sales/shipments of more than 500,000 copies in the United States.

Background
During his hospital-dictated year of bedrest, Stevens began writing a catalogue of songs to fill far more than his next album. After his recovery, he negotiated out of his contract with Deram Records and worked with former Yardbirds bassist Paul Samwell-Smith on a stripped-down sound. In contrast to his first two albums, these new songs were sparse arrangements. They were played on acoustic guitars and keyboards and accompanied by a smaller backing band, consisting of three other performers: second guitarist Alun Davies, bassist John Ryan, and drummer Harvey Burns—and on one song, "Katmandu", Peter Gabriel on the flute. Samwell-Smith also produced the album and brought Stevens a high-fidelity sound that was not as present on his previous releases. Samwell-Smith was one of the early producers in rock to push the lower bass frequencies more prominently into the mix in an attempt to keep up with the new audiophile generation, which was embracing larger home speakers and high-end phonographic cartridges. Stevens began to make the transition from pop musician to a folk-rock performer when the term "singer-songwriter" was just being coined.

The songs themselves were darker in tone: the madrigal-inspired ballad "Lady D'Arbanville" elevated the tragedy of a lost lover (in this case, Stevens' former girlfriend Patti D'Arbanville) to that of a deceased one and "Trouble" was a plea to stave off death. There were also lighter songs: "Pop Star" showcased Stevens' dramatic change in voice by satirising the triviality of celebrity.

Though "Lady D'Arbanville" would reach No. 8 on the British charts, Mona Bone Jakon was only a modest success upon its initial release. The album attracted attention, however, in the wake of the commercial breakthrough of its follow-up, Tea for the Tillerman, and with the inclusion of three of its songs ("Trouble", "I Wish, I Wish", and "I Think I See the Light") in Hal Ashby and Colin Higgins's 1971 black comedy, Harold and Maude.

Origin of title
According to a 1972 interview with Stevens, the inspiration for the title was a name he created to describe his penis: "'Mona Bone Jakon' is another name for my penis. It's the name I give it. It's not some sort of secret vocabulary, it's just something I made up."

Journalist Robert Chalmers reiterated this point for a 2003 interview with Yusuf Islam for The Independent on Sunday when he wrote: "When [Stevens] re-emerged in 1969, he had more than 40 new songs and released three triumphant albums in 15 months on Chris Blackwell's Island label: Mona Bone Jakon (his pet word for penis), Tea for the Tillerman and Teaser and the Firecat."

Critical reception

In a contemporary review for The Village Voice, music critic Robert Christgau said that after the commercial failure of New Masters, "this one has a nice post-creative trauma feel, intimate and sensitive. Recommended to singer/songwriter specialists." In a retrospective review, Allmusic's William Ruhlmann gave it four out of five stars and called it "a group of simple, heartfelt songs played in spare arrangements on acoustic guitars and keyboards and driven by a restrained rhythm section." He added that "Stevens' craggy voice, with its odd breaks of tone and occasional huskiness, lent these sometimes sketchy songs depth".

Track listing

Personnel
 Cat Stevens – acoustic guitar, classical guitar, keyboards, vocals
 Alun Davies – acoustic guitar, backing vocals
 John Ryan – double bass
 Harvey Burns – drums, percussion
 Peter Gabriel – flute on "Katmandu"
 Del Newman – strings, arrangements

Production
 Producer – Paul Samwell-Smith
 Engineer – Michael Bobak
 Mixing – Paul Hicks
 Supervisor – Bill Levenson
 Coordinator – Beth Stempel
 Mastering – Ted Jensen
 Design – Roland Young, Mike Diehl
 Illustrations – Cat Stevens
 Photography – Grazia Neri, Richard Stirling

Charts

Certifications and sales

Notes

1970 albums
A&M Records albums
Albums produced by Paul Samwell-Smith
Cat Stevens albums
Island Records albums
Albums recorded at Olympic Sound Studios